Sheldon A. Wasserman (born August 5, 1961) is an American physician and politician, currently serving as Milwaukee County Supervisor for the 3rd District.  Wasserman is a member of the Democratic Party and formerly served in the Wisconsin State Assembly from 1995 to 2009, representing the 22nd Assembly District.

Biography
Wasserman earned his undergraduate degree at the University of Wisconsin–Milwaukee and his M.D. degree from the Medical College of Wisconsin in 1987.  He is married and has three children.

In 2008, Wasserman unsuccessfully challenged Republican state senator Alberta Darling in the 8th District.  In 2016, after eight years out of politics, Wasserman was elected to the Milwaukee County Board of Supervisors without opposition, representing the 3rd District, which comprises the East Side of Milwaukee and several North Shore suburbs.

References

External links
Wisconsin Assembly - Representative Sheldon Wasserman official government website
Sheldon Wasserman for State Senate official campaign website
 
 Follow the Money - Sheldon Wasserman
2008 2006 2004 2002 2000 1998 campaign contributions

Living people
1961 births
Politicians from Milwaukee
Democratic Party members of the Wisconsin State Assembly
Medical College of Wisconsin alumni
21st-century American politicians